The 41st FIS Nordic World Ski Championships were held from 20 February to 3 March 2019 in Seefeld in Tirol, Tyrol, Austria. It was the second time Seefeld in Tirol hosted the world championships, the event having been hosted there previously in 1985.

Host selection
Championships was awarded to Seefeld in Tirol in Tyrol in Austria during the FIS Congress from 1–6 June 2014 in Barcelona, Spain.

Finalist applicants were Seefeld in Tirol (Austria), Oberstdorf (Germany), Planica (Slovenia) and Almaty (Kazakhstan). Oberstdorf had already applied for 2013, 2015 and 2017, Planica for 2017. Seefeld submitted its candidacy shortly before the deadline.

The Austrian winter sports resort had hosted the Championships in 1985, the German resort of Oberstdorf in 1987 and 2005.

Detailed application concepts were to be submitted by 1 September 2013.

Schedule
All times are local (UTC+1).

Cross-country

Nordic combined

Ski jumping

Medal summary

Medal table

Cross-country skiing

Men

Women

Nordic combined

Ski jumping

Men

Women

Mixed

Venues

The cross-country skiing events took place at the Seefeld Nordic Competence Centre. The ski jumping large hill events were held in the Bergisel Ski Jump in Innsbruck. The Bergisel Ski Jump is a large ski jumping hill with a hill size of 130 and a construction point (K-spot) of 120. It has a spectator capacity of 26,000. The current structure dates from 2003. The normal hill competitions were held in the Toni-Seelos-Olympiaschanze normal hill with a hill size of 109 and a K-point of 99.

Medal ceremonies were held at the Medal Plaza, a square in the town center.

Doping
Five cross-country skiers (Max Hauke and Dominik Baldauf from Austria, Andreas Veerpalu and Karel Tammjärv from Estonia, as well as Alexey Poltoranin from Kazakhstan.) were caught during Operation Aderlass.

References

External links
Official website

 
FIS Nordic World Ski Championships
2019 in cross-country skiing
2019 in ski jumping
2019 in Nordic combined
2019 in Austrian sport
International sports competitions hosted by Austria
Nordic skiing competitions in Austria
Seefeld in Tirol
Sport in Tyrol (state)
February 2019 sports events in Austria
March 2019 sports events in Austria